This article lists the main rivers of Tamil Nadu.  Out of the below rivers, Kaveri, Thenpennai, Palar,  are the three largest rivers of Tamil Nadu followed by Vaigai River, Noyyal River, Cheyyar River, Then Pennai, Vellar River (Northern Tamil Nadu), Vellar River (Southern Tamil Nadu), Moyar River, Pampar River, Bhavani River, Thamirabarani River, Vaippar River are the major rivers in Tamil Nadu. (Listed in the order of longest rivers first).
Sarabanga nadhi ( Idappadi)
Nallaru ( Aninasi )
Kausika nadhi ( Periyanaickan palayam)

A
 Adyar River
 Amaravati River
 Ambuliyar River
 Agniyar River
 Arasalar River
 Agaram Aru
 Arjuna River
 Ayyanarkovil River
 Adappar River
 Arani River
 Agniar River - Tirupur

B
 Bhavani River
 Bambar River

C
 Chittar 
 Coonoor 
 Cooum
 Cheyyar

G
 Gingee River
 Gomukhi River
 Goddar River
 Gadananathi River
 Gundar River

H
 Hanumannathi River
 Harichandra River

J
 Jambunathi River

K
 Kallar River
 Kamandala River
 Kaveri River
 Kedilam River
 Kollidam River
 Kodaganar River
 Komugi River
 Kaundinya River
 Kowsika River
 Kudamurutti River
 Kundha River
 Kottagudi River
 Karipottan River
 Kottagudi River
 Karuppanathi River
 Karunaiyar River
 Kottamalaiyaru River
 Kothaiyaru River
 Kowsika River
 Kundar River
 Kaattar River
 Kosasthalaiyar River
 Kousika River
 Kodayar River
 Korai River

M
 Malattar River
 Manimuthar River (tributary of Thamirabarani)
 Manimuthar River (tributary of Vellar)
 Thirumanimuthar River (tributary of Kaveri)
 Manimuthar River (tributary of Pambar)
 Mayura River
 Moyar River
 Mudikondan River
 Markanda River
 Mundhal Odai River
 Mottaiyar River
 Mullaiyar River
 Manjalaru
 Marudaiyaru River (Ariyalur)

N
 Noyyal River
 Naganathi River
 Nanganjiyar river
 Nandalar River
 Nattar River
 Nallar River

O
 Odampokki River

P
 Pazhayar River
 Pachaiyar River
 Pambar River (Northern Tamil Nadu)
 Pambar River (Southern Tamil Nadu)
 Pahrali River
 Palar River
 Parambikulam River
 Ponnaiyar River
 Pykara River
 Pandavaiar River 
 Pamaniyar River

R
 Rajasingiyaru River
 Ramanathi River

S
 Samriti Shanmuganadhi River
 Sigur River
 Siruvani River
 South Pennar River
 Suvetha River
 Sarabanga River
 Sarugani River
 Santhana varthini River

T
 Thamirabarani River
 Thenpennai River
 Tondiar River
 Thirumalairajan River
 Thennar River
 Thirumanimutharu River
 Thennar River

U
 Uppar River
 Upper Gundar River

V
 Vaigai River
 Vaippar River
 Vanniyar River
 Vennaaru River
 Varaganathi River
 Vashista River
 Veera Chozhan river
 Vellar River (Northern Tamil Nadu)
 Vellar River (Southern Tamil Nadu)
 Vedamaliyaru River
 Vettar River
 Vennar River
 Valavaikkal River
 Vari River
 Vembar River
 Vellanguruchi River

See also
 List of Lakes in Tamil Nadu

 
Tamil Nadu